SS Winnipeg was a French steamer notable for arriving at Valparaíso, Chile, on 3 September 1939, with 2,200 Spanish immigrants aboard. The refugees were fleeing Spain after Franco's victory in the Spanish Civil War (1936–1939). The Chilean President Pedro Aguirre Cerda had named the poet Pablo Neruda Special Consul in Paris for Immigration, and he was charged with what he called "the noblest mission I have ever undertaken": shipping the Spanish refugees, who had been housed by the French government in internment camps, to Chile.

History 
After the end of the Spanish Civil War, Pablo Neruda noticed that many Spanish Republicans had fled in exile to France where they were detained in squalid camps in miserable conditions. The poet, who was then living in Chile, decided to organize their travel to Chile. He first worked as Chilean consul in Spain, before being named consul in Paris.

The ship was an old French cargo ship which ordinarily could not take more than 250 persons, but it was adapted so it could carry the 2,200 refugees. Neruda actively worked in this endeavour, reuniting  families separated by the war. Beside the assistance of his friends artists and writers, he was helped by his wife .

On the night when Winnipeg set sail, on 4 August 1939, in the port of Trompeloup - Pauillac, Pablo Neruda wrote:

Winnipeg arrived at the port of Valparaíso on 3 September 1939. On the following day, the Spanish Republicans were officially received by the Chilean authorities. Some of them had already landed, a few days before, in the port of Arica, in northern Chile. In a gesture of gratitude, the refugees attached to the ship's mast a large canvas with the face of the Chilean president painted on it.

Most of the immigrants who landed in Chile stayed there. Among them were the historian Leopoldo Castedo, the typographer Mauricio Amster and the painters Roser Bru and José Balmes. Victor Pey, who boarded the ship after being a prisoner of war in France, became one of the closest advisors to Salvador Allende.

SS Winnipeg remained under French flag after the fall of France in 1940 and sailed under orders of the Vichy government. She was captured on 26 May 1941 by the Dutch sloop  in the Caribbean Sea and confiscated by the British government. She was eventually purchased by a Canadian company, Canadian Pacific Steamships, some months later and renamed Winnipeg II. All people on board were rescued by the Canadian corvette .

See also
 Demographics of Chile
 Presidential Republic Era (1924–1973)

References

External links
 Neruda habla sobre el Winnipeg 
 Los andaluces, Neruda y el Winnipeg  
 SS Winnipeg II (+1942)
 A partial list of passengers aboard the Winnipeg

Spanish Civil War
1939 in Chile
1939 in Spain
1918 ships
Ships built in France
Ships of France
Steamships of Canada
Ships sunk by German submarines in World War II
World War II shipwrecks in the Atlantic Ocean
Maritime incidents in May 1941
Maritime incidents in October 1942
Ships of the Compagnie Générale Transatlantique
Spanish emigrants to Chile
Chile–Spain relations